This article provides details of international football games played by the Vietnam women's national football team from 2020–present.

Result

2020

2021

2022

2023

Head-to-head records

 Vietnam women's national football team